Joseph Inguimberty (18 January 1896, in Marseille – 8 October 1971, in Menton) was a French painter, and teacher at the École des Beaux-Arts de l'Indochine (EBAI) in Hanoi 1926–1945. His teaching was appreciated for being less academic than the director Victor Tardieu. He shared with Tardieu a keen interest in Vietnam's culture. Inguimberty encouraged his students to experiment with lacquer painting as a fine art painting medium.

References

External links
 Official website - Joseph Inguimberty
 Witness Collection - Joseph Inguimberty

1896 births
1971 deaths
20th-century French painters
20th-century French male artists
French male painters
Artists from Marseille